Fontaine is a commune in the Isère department in southeastern France. Part of the Grenoble urban unit (agglomeration), it is the third-largest suburb of the city of Grenoble, and is adjacent to it on the west.

Population

Twin towns — sister cities
Fontaine is twinned with:

  Schmalkalden, Germany (1963)
  Alpignano, Italy (1971)
  Sommatino, Italy (1991)

See also
Parc naturel régional du Vercors

References

External links

 Official website (in French)

Communes of Isère